An anaerobic organism or anaerobe is any organism that does not require molecular oxygen for growth. It may react negatively or even die if free oxygen is present. In contrast, an aerobic organism (aerobe) is an organism that requires an oxygenated environment. Anaerobes may be unicellular (e.g. protozoans, bacteria) or multicellular.
Most fungi are obligate aerobes, requiring oxygen to survive. However, some species, such as the Chytridiomycota that reside in the rumen of cattle, are obligate anaerobes; for these species, anaerobic respiration is used because oxygen will disrupt their metabolism or kill them. Deep waters of the ocean are a common anoxic environment.

First recorded observation
In his 14 June 1680 letter to The Royal Society, Antonie van Leeuwenhoek described an experiment he carried out by filling two identical glass tubes about halfway with crushed pepper powder, to which some clean rain water was added. Van Leeuwenhoek sealed one of the glass tubes using a flame and left the other glass tube open. Several days later, he discovered in the open glass tube 'a great many very little animalcules, of divers sort having its own particular motion.' Not expecting to see any life in the sealed glass tube, Van Leeuwenhoek saw to his surprise 'a kind of living animalcules that were round and bigger than the biggest sort that I have said were in the other water.' The conditions in the sealed tube had become quite anaerobic due to consumption of oxygen by aerobic microorganisms.

In 1913, Martinus Beijerinck repeated Van Leeuwenhoek's experiment and identified Clostridium butyricum as a prominent anaerobic bacterium in the sealed pepper infusion tube liquid. Beijerinck commented:

Classifications

For practical purposes, there are three categories of anaerobe:
 Obligate anaerobes, which are harmed by the presence of oxygen. Two examples of obligate anaerobes are Clostridium botulinum and the bacteria which live near hydrothermal vents on the deep-sea ocean floor.
 Aerotolerant organisms, which cannot use oxygen for growth, but tolerate its presence.
 Facultative anaerobes, which can grow without oxygen but use oxygen if it is present.

However, this classification has been questioned after recent research showed that human "obligate anaerobes" (such as Finegoldia magna or the methanogenic archaea Methanobrevibacter smithii) can be grown in aerobic atmosphere if the culture medium is supplemented with antioxidants such as ascorbic acid, glutathione and uric acid.

Energy metabolism
Some obligate anaerobes use fermentation, while others use anaerobic respiration. Aerotolerant organisms are strictly fermentative. In the presence of oxygen, facultative anaerobes use aerobic respiration. In the absence of oxygen, some facultative anaerobes use fermentation, while others may use anaerobic respiration.

Fermentation 
There are many anaerobic fermentative reactions.

Fermentative anaerobic organisms typically use the lactic acid fermentation pathway:

The energy released in this reaction (without ADP and phosphate) is approximately 150 kJ per mol, which is conserved in generating two ATP from ADP per glucose. This is only 5% of the energy per sugar molecule that the typical aerobic reaction generates.

Plants and fungi (e.g., yeasts) in general use alcohol (ethanol) fermentation when oxygen becomes limiting:

The energy released is about 180 kJ per mol, which is conserved in generating two ATP from ADP per glucose.

Anaerobic bacteria and archaea use these and many other fermentative pathways, e.g., propionic acid fermentation, butyric acid fermentation, solvent fermentation, mixed acid fermentation, butanediol fermentation, Stickland fermentation, acetogenesis, or methanogenesis.

Culturing anaerobes 
Since normal microbial culturing occurs in atmospheric air, which contains molecular oxygen, culturing of anaerobes requires special techniques. A number of techniques are employed by microbiologists when culturing anaerobic organisms, for example, handling the bacteria in a glovebox filled with nitrogen or the use of other specially sealed containers, or techniques such as injection of the bacteria into a dicot plant, which is an environment with limited oxygen. The GasPak System is an isolated container that achieves an anaerobic environment by the reaction of water with sodium borohydride and sodium bicarbonate tablets to produce hydrogen gas and carbon dioxide. Hydrogen then reacts with oxygen gas on a palladium catalyst to produce more water, thereby removing oxygen gas. The issue with the GasPak method is that an adverse reaction can take place where the bacteria may die, which is why a thioglycollate medium should be used. The thioglycollate supplies a medium mimicking that of a dicot plant, thus providing not only an anaerobic environment but all the nutrients needed for the bacteria to multiply.

Recently, a French team evidenced a link between redox and gut anaerobes  based on clinical studies of severe acute malnutrition. These findings led to the development of aerobic culture of "anaerobes" by the addition of antioxidants in the culture medium.

Multicellularity
Few multicellular life forms are anaerobic, since only aerobic respiration can provide enough energy for a complex metabolism. Exceptions include three species of Loricifera (< 1 mm in size) and the 10-cell Henneguya zschokkei.

In 2010 three species of anaerobic loricifera were discovered in the hypersaline anoxic L'Atalante basin at the bottom of the Mediterranean Sea. They lack mitochondria which contain the oxidative phosphorylation pathway, which in all other animals combines oxygen with glucose to produce metabolic energy, and thus they consume no oxygen. Instead these loricifera derive their energy from hydrogen using hydrogenosomes.

References

Microbiology